Andrew William Ratcliffe (born 27 April 1955) is an Australian former athlete who competed as a sprinter. He was a four-time New South Wales state 100 metres champion and a Commonwealth Games gold medalist.

Athletics career
Active in the 1970s, Ratcliffe is an Old Boy of Scots College in Sydney and was a GPS record holder. He received coaching from Trinidad Olympic athlete Mike Agostini. In 1973, Ratcliffe represented Australia at the Pacific Conference Games in Toronto and the World University Games in Moscow. He was a 4x100 metres gold medalist at the 1974 British Commonwealth Games in Christchurch (teamed with Greg Lewis, Laurie D'Arcy and Graham Haskell).

References

External links
Andrew Ratcliffe at World Athletics

1955 births
Living people
Australian male sprinters
Commonwealth Games gold medallists for Australia
Commonwealth Games medallists in athletics
Athletes (track and field) at the 1974 British Commonwealth Games
Competitors at the 1973 Summer Universiade
People educated at Scots College (Sydney)
Medallists at the 1974 British Commonwealth Games